Guido Casty is a Swiss bobsledder who competed in the mid-1970s. He won a silver medal in the four-man event at the 1974 FIBT World Championships in St. Moritz.

References
Bobsleigh four-man world championship medalists since 1930

Possibly living people
Swiss male bobsledders
Year of birth missing (living people)
20th-century Swiss people